Ithycyphus is a genus of venomous snakes in the family Pseudoxyrhophiidae. The genus is found only on the island of Madagascar. Species in the genus Ithycyphus are potentially harmful to humans (see Ithycyphus miniatus).

Species
Five species are recognized as being valid.
Ithycyphus blanci Domergue, 1988
Ithycyphus goudoti (Schlegel, 1837) – forest night snake 
Ithycyphus miniatus (Schlegel, 1837) – tiny night snake
Ithycyphus oursi Domergue, 1986
Ithycyphus perineti Domergue, 1986

References

Further reading
Boulenger GA (1896). Catalogue of the Snakes in the British Museum (Natural History). Volume III., Containing the Colubridæ (Opisthoglyphæ and Proteroglyphæ), ... London: Trustees of the British Museum (Natural History). (Taylor and Francis, printers). xiv + 727 pp. + Plates I-XXV. (Genus Ithycyphus, p. 34).
Günther A (1873). "Description of a new Snake from Madagascar". Annals and Magazine of Natural History, Fourth Series 11: 374–375. (Ithycyphus, new genus).

Snake genera
Taxa named by Albert Günther
Reptiles of Madagascar
Pseudoxyrhophiidae